Anitys is a genus of beetles in the family Ptinidae. There is at least one described species in Anitys, A. rubens.

References

Further reading

External links

 

Ptinidae